Datta is a Bengali romantic drama film based on the novel with the same name written by Sarat Chandra Chattopadhyay. It was first made in 1951 and again in 1976.

Plot
Bijoya's father Banamali had informally engaged her to Naren, the son of his friend Jagdish. But Bijoya is attracted to Bilaas, son of another friend of Banamali. She has some hearsay knowledge about Naren and develops a negative image of Naren in her mind. But when she meets Naren, who is a doctor by profession the scenario starts changing. She starts to love Naren and realises that her conception about Naren is all wrong.

Controversy
1951 version
This film is wrongly indexed in IMDb as Datta (II) (1976) instead of Datta (1951).YouTube does not give the year but names Ahindra Choudhury as a star in this movie. IMDb apparently finds no difficulty in having Ahindra, who died in 1974, resurrecting himself to act in a 1976 movie!

Director
Saumyen Mukhopadhyay (Mukherji)

Music director
Timir Baran (Bhattacharya),Dwijen Chowdhury

Cast
 Sunanda Banerjee as Bijoya
 Purnendu Mukherjee as Naren
 Ahindra Choudhury as Rashbehari
 Jahar Ganguly as Bilas
 Anubha Gupta
 Kali Sarkar
 Sukhen Das 

This version is faithful to Saratchandra's text.

1976 version
This version is indexed in IMDb as Datta (I) (1976). This film has major deviations from Saratchandra's novel.

Director
Ajoy Kar

Music director
Hemanta Mukherjee

Cast
 Soumitra Chatterjee as Naren.
 Suchitra Sen as Bijoya
 Samit Bhanja as Bilas
 Utpal Dutt as Rasbihari
 Gita De
 Sumitra Mukherjee as Nalini
 Shailen Mukherjee
 Dilip Bose

References

External links
 
1951 films
1976 films
Bengali-language Indian films
1950s Bengali-language films
1970s Bengali-language films
Films based on works by Sarat Chandra Chattopadhyay
Indian drama films
Indian black-and-white films
Films based on Indian novels
Indian romantic drama films
Films directed by Ajoy Kar
Films scored by Hemant Kumar
Films scored by Timir Baran